Ontario South was a federal electoral district represented in the House of Commons of Canada from 1867 to 1925. It was located in the province of Ontario. It was created by the British North America Act of 1867.

The South riding consisted initially of the Townships of Whitby and East Whitby, Pickering, the Town of Whitby and the Village of Oshawa.

In 1882, the Township of Reach and the village of Port Perry were added to the riding.

The electoral district was abolished in 1924 when it was merged into Ontario riding.

Electoral history

|- 
  
|Liberal-Conservative
|Thomas Nicholson Gibbs 
|align="right"| 1,292    
  
|Liberal
|George Brown
|align="right"| 1,223   
|}

|- 
  
|Liberal-Conservative
|Thomas Nicholson Gibbs 
|align="right"| 1,466    
 
|Unknown
|P. White Trueman
|align="right"| 1,373   
 
|Unknown
|Mr. White    
|align="right"|   
|}
Note: Newspaper for the time recorded the name of Gibbs' opponent as Truman P. White.
|- 
  
|Liberal-Conservative
|Thomas Nicholson Gibbs 
|align="right"| acclaimed    
|}

|- 
  
|Liberal
|Malcolm Cameron  
|align="right"| 1,639   
  
|Liberal-Conservative
|Thomas Nicholson Gibbs 
|align="right"|  1,488    
|}

|- 
  
|Liberal-Conservative
|Thomas Nicholson Gibbs 
|align="right"| 1,665    
 
|Unknown
|James D. Edgar
|align="right"| 1,627   
|}

|- 
  
|Liberal
|Francis Wayland Glen 
|align="right"| 1,867   
  
|Liberal-Conservative
|Thomas Nicholson Gibbs 
|align="right"|  1,661    
|}

|- 
  
|Liberal
|Francis Wayland Glen 
|align="right"| 1,668   
  
|Conservative
|William Smith  
|align="right"| 1,618    
|}

|- 
  
|Conservative
|William Smith  
|align="right"| 2,118    
  
|Liberal
|Francis Rae  
|align="right"| 1,931   
|}

|- 
  
|Liberal
|James Ironside Davidson
|align="right"|2,042   
  
|Conservative
|William Smith  
|align="right"| 2,009    
|}

|- 
  
|Conservative
|William Smith  
|align="right"| acclaimed    
|}

|- 
  
|Liberal
|Leonard Burnett   
|align="right"| 2,165   
  
|Conservative
|William Smith 
|align="right"| 2,021    
|}

|- 
  
|Liberal
|William Ross
|align="right"| 1,970   
  
|Conservative
|William Smith 
|align="right"|1,876    
|}

|- 
  
|Conservative
|Peter Christie  
|align="right"| 2,544    
  
|Liberal
|William Ross  
|align="right"|2,439   
|}

|- 
  
|Liberal
|FOWKE, Fred Luther  
|align="right"| 2,939   
  
|Conservative
|CHRISTIE, Peter  
|align="right"|2,696    
|}

|- 
  
|Conservative
|William Smith   
|align="right"| 2,917    
  
|Liberal
|Frederick Luther Fowke  
|align="right"|  2,547   
|}

|- 
  
|Government
|William Smith     
|align="right"| 5,205  
  
|Opposition
|W. E. N. Sinclair   
|align="right"| 2,682   
|}

|- 
  
|Liberal
|CLIFFORD, Lawson Omar  
|align="right"|5,102   
  
|Conservative
|William Smith  
|align="right"| 4,923    

|}

See also 

 List of Canadian federal electoral districts
 Past Canadian electoral districts

References

External links 

 Website of the Parliament of Canada

Former federal electoral districts of Ontario